Impressions de la haute Mongolie (Hommage à Raymond Roussel) is a 1976 comedy film directed by Salvador Dalí and José Montes-Baquer, starring Dalí. It is a mockumentary about a hunt through Mongolia for a giant hallucinogenic mushroom. The film is dedicated to Raymond Roussel, author of the similarly titled novel Impressions d’Afrique.

References

External links
 https://www.salvador-dali.org/en/dali/dali-film-library/films-and-video-art/3/impressions-de-la-haute-mongolie-hommage-a-raymond-roussel

1976 films
Film with screenplays by Salvador Dalí
Spanish independent films
Spanish comedy films
Surreal comedy films
Mockumentary films
Films set in Mongolia